Rosalie Parker is an author, scriptwriter and editor who runs the Tartarus Press with R. B. Russell.

Parker jointly won the World Fantasy Award "Special Award: Non-Professional" for publishing in 2002, 2004 and 2012. 
The Horror Writers Association gave Parker and Russell the "Excellence in Speciality Press Publishing" award for 2009.

Her anthology, Strange Tales, won the 2004 World Fantasy Award for Best Anthology.

Parker's first collection of short stories, The Old Knowledge, was published in 2010. Her short story "In the Garden" was selected by Stephen Jones for The Mammoth Book of Best New Horror 21 (Robinson Publishing, 2010). "Random Flight" was included in Best British Horror 2015. Her second collection, Damage was longlisted for the 2016 Edge Hill Short Story Prize.

Parker is co-director/producer of Robert Aickman: Author of Strange Tales, released May 2015, and Coverdale: A Year in the Life, released February 2016.

Literary work

Short Story Collections by Parker
The Old Knowledge and Other Stories, Swan River Press (Dublin), 2010. Reprinted 2012
Damage, PS Publishing (Hornsea, East Yorkshire), 2016
Sparks from the Fire, Swan River Press (Dublin), 2018.
Through the Storm, PS Publishing (Hornsea, East Yorkshire), 2020
Dream Fox and Other Strange Stories, Tartarus Press (Carlton, Coverdale, North Yorkshire), 2023

Short Stories written by Parker
"Spirit Solutions", The Black Veil & Other Tales of Supernatural Sleuths, Wordsworth Editions, 2008
"In the Garden", The Fifth Black Book of Horror, Mortbury Press, 2009. Reprinted The Mammoth Book of Best New Horror 21 (Robinson Publishing, 2010)
"Oracle", Dark World, Tartarus Press, 2013
"The Nurse’s Letter: An Addendum to ‘The White People’", Faunus 27, The Friends of Arthur Machen, 2013
"The Thames", Terror Tales of London, Gray Friar Press, 2013
"Untouchable", The Horror Fields, Morpheus Tales, 2014
"Random Flight", Terror Tales of Yorkshire, Gray Friar Press, 2014
"Selkie: A Scottish Idyll", Supernatural Tales 29, 2015
"Homecraft", Uncertainties, Volume II, Swan River Press, 2016
"The Bronze Statuette", Supernatural Tales 33, 2016
"The Attempt", Shadows and Tall Trees 7, 2017
"The Dreaming", Black Static # 59, 2017
"Waiting", The Book of the Sea, Egaeus Press, 2018
"Chimera", Great British Horror 3: For Those in Peril, Black Shuck Books, 2018
"The Moor", Supernatural Tales, 39, November 2018
"The Decision", Supernatural Tales 45, Winter 2020/21
"Holiday Reading", Best New Horror 30, Winter 2020
"Home Comforts", Infra Noir 2020, Zagava Books, 2021
"Homecoming", Dreamland: Other Stories, Black Shuck Books, 2021
"Madre de Dios", Raphus Press, 2021
"Dream Fox", They're Out to Get You, TK Pulp, 2021
"All Talk", Supernatural Tales 49, 2022 
"Aircrew", Grotequeries, Zagava, 2022
"Bipolarity", Grotequeries, Zagava, 2022
"The Walled Garden: A Fable", Fabulous Aesop, Zagava, 2022

Works edited by Parker
Tales from Tartarus, edited with R. B. Russell, Tartarus Press, 1995
Ghost Stories, by Oliver Onions Tartarus Press, 2000
Dromenon, The Best Weird Stories, by Gerald Heard, Tartarus Press, 2001
The Collected Macabre Stories, by L.P. Hartley, Tartarus Press, 2001
Various Temptations, by William Sansom, Tartarus Press, 2002
Strange Tales I, Tartarus Press, 2003
Tarnhelm, The Best Supernatural Stories, by Hugh Walpole, Tartarus Press, 2003
The Suicide Club and Other Dark Adventures, by Robert Louis Stevenson, Tartarus Press, 2004
Father Raven and Other Tales, by A.E. Coppard, Tartarus Press, 2006
The Sense of the Past, by Henry James, Tartarus Press, 2006
The Man Who Could Work Miracles, by H.G. Wells, Tartarus Press, 2006
Strangers and Pilgrims, by Walter de la Mare, Tartarus Press, 2007
Strange Tales II, Tartarus Press, 2007
The Triumph of Night and Other Tales, by Edith Wharton, Tartarus Press, 2008
Sredni Vashtar, by Saki, Tartarus Press, 2008
The Sandman and Other Night Pieces, by E. T. A. Hoffmann, Tartarus Press, 2008
An Occurrence at Owl Creek Bridge and Other Stories, by Ambrose Bierce, Tartarus Press, 2008
The Snow-Image and Other Stories of the Supernatural, by Nathaniel Hawthorne, Tartarus Press, 2008
The Legend of Sleepy Hollow and Other Stories, by Washington Irving, Tartarus Press, 2009
Strange Tales III, Tartarus Press, 2009
Nightmare Touch, by Lafcadio Hearn, Tartarus Press, 2010
Clarimonde and Other Stories, by Theophile Gautier, Tartarus Press, 2011
Strange Tales IV, Tartarus Press, 2014
Strange Tales V, Tartarus Press, 2015
Green Thoughts, by John Collier, Tartarus Press, 2016

Articles Contributed to Magazines
Aleister Crowley, Book and Magazine Collector 297, August 2008
Margaret Atwood, Book and Magazine Collector 302, Christmas 2008
Harry Crosby, Book and Magazine Collector 305, March 2009
Alastair, Book and Magazine Collector 309, July 2009
Count Stenbock, Book and Magazine Collector 317, February 2010
A.E. Waite, Book and Magazine Collector 322, July 2010
Edith Wharton, Book and Magazine Collector 323, August 2010

Film/video
Coverdale: A Year in the Life, 2016 (co-director/producer)
Robert Aickman: Author of Strange Tales, 2015 (co-director/producer)
Intrusions: Looking After Aickman, 2014 (co-director/producer)
Current 93: Live at Halifax Minster, 2014 (co-director/producer)

References

External links
 Rosalie Parker website
 Rosalie Parker interviewed by John Kenny
 Rosalie Parker interviewed (with Ray Russell) by Rick Kleffel at the Agony Column Podcast

Living people
English short story writers
World Fantasy Award-winning writers
Year of birth missing (living people)
Women speculative fiction editors